The Puente Romano de Talamanca de Jarama is a Roman bridge located in Talamanca de Jarama, in the Community of Madrid, Spain.

The bridge is Roman in origin. It was remodelled in medieval times.
It no longer crosses the river Jarama, as the river has changed course. Under the name Puente Sobre El Arroyo del Caz,
it was declared Bien de Interés Cultural in 1996 (RI-51-0009585).

References

External sources 

Bridges in the Community of Madrid
Talamanca de Jarama
Roman bridges in Spain
Bien de Interés Cultural landmarks in the Community of Madrid